Abdoulaye Kaloga (born 19 December 1959) is a Malian former professional footballer who played as a midfielder.

Career
Kaloga was a left-footed central midfielder. He spent most of his playing career with Stade Malien, and finished his career with S.C. Covilhã in the Primeira Divisão.

Kaloga played for the Mali national team, scoring the winning goal in a 1986 African Cup of Nations qualifier against Benin on 18 November 1984. He also played in an unofficial Mali international squad in 1989.

References

External links
 
 Article on Malian football
 

1959 births
Living people
Malian footballers
Association football midfielders
Mali international footballers
Primeira Liga players
Stade Malien players
S.C. Covilhã players
Malian expatriate footballers
Malian expatriate sportspeople in Portugal
Expatriate footballers in Portugal
21st-century Malian people